In the Philippines, a government-owned and controlled corporation (GOCC), sometimes with an "and/or", is a state-owned enterprise that conducts both commercial and non-commercial activity. Examples of the latter would be the Government Service Insurance System (GSIS), a social security system for government employees. There are 219 GOCCs as of 2022. GOCCs both receive subsidies and pay dividends to the national government.

Under the GOCC Governance Act (Republic Act No. 10149), GOCCs are overseen by the Governance Commission for Government-Owned or Controlled Corporations (GCG). The Governance Commission is the "government's central advisory and oversight body over the public corporate sector" according to the Official Gazette of the Philippine government. The Governance Commission among other duties prepares for the president of the Philippines a shortlist of candidates for appointment by the president to GOCC boards.

Many but not all GOCCs have their own charter or law outlining its responsibilities and governance.

Finances 

GOCCs receive from the government "subsidies" and "program funds". Subsidies cover the day-to-day operations of the GOCCs when revenues are insufficient while program funds are given to profitable GOCCs to pay for a specific program or project.

Subsidies from the National Government in 2011 amounted to 21 billion Philippine pesos. In the 2013 fiscal year, the national government gave P71.9 billion pesos to GOCCs in subsidies, nearly twice the 44.7 billion pesos that was programmed in the budget. In 2014, 77.04 billion pesos was spent on GOCCs by the national government, 3% of which was classified as subsidies and 97% was classified as program funds.

In 2013, on "GOCC Dividend Day", the Philippine government received 28-billion Philippine pesos in dividends and other forms of remittances from the 2012 operations of 38 GOCCs. Eight GOCCs remitted 1 billion pesos each: Philippine Reclamation Authority (PRA)(P1 billion pesos), Philippine Ports Authority (PPA)(1.03-billion), Manila International Airport Authority (MIAA)(P1.54-billion), Philippine Amusement and Gaming Corporation (PAGCOR) (P7.18-billion), Power Sector Assets and Liabilities Management Corporation (PSALM)(P2-billion), Bases Conversion Development Authority (BCDA)(P2.30-billion), Development Bank of the Philippines (DBP) (P3.16-billion) and Land Bank of the Philippines (LBP) (P6.24-billion). Under Republic Act No. 7656, all GOCCs are required to "declare and remit at least 50% of their annual net earnings as cash, stock or property dividends to the National Government." The Commission on Audit reports that in 2013 of the 219 profitable GOCCs, only 45 remitted a full 50% share of their dividends to the national treasury, leaving 174 others with unremitted government shares, amounting to more than P50 billion. Dividends remitted were only one-tenth (1/10) of the total required by law according to the commission.

In 2014, on "GOCC Dividend Day", the Philippine government received 32.31 billion Philippine pesos worth of dividends and other remittances from 50 GOCCs. Seven GOCCs submitted over a billion pesos each: Development Bank of the Philippines (DBP) with P3.616 billion; Power Sector Assets and Liabilities Management Corporation (PSALM) with P2.5 billion; Bases Conversion Development Authority (BCDA) with P2.107 billion; Manila International Airport Authority (MIAA) with P1.577 billion; Philippine National Oil Company-Exploration Corporation (PNOC-EC) with P1.5 billion; Philippine Ports Authority (PPA) with P1.422 billion; and Philippine Deposit Insurance Corporation (PDIC) with P1.05 billion.

List 

List adapted from Integrated Corporate Reporting System's list.

Government financial institutions

Banking institutions 
Al-Amanah Islamic Investment Bank of the Philippines (AIIBP)
Development Bank of the Philippines (DBP)
DBP Data Center, Inc. (DCI)
Land Bank of the Philippines (LBP)
Land Bank Countryside Development Foundation, Inc. (LCDFI)
LBP Resources and Development Corporation (LBRDC)
Overseas Filipino Bank (OFB)
UCPB Savings Bank (UCPB-SB)

Non-banking institutions 
Credit Information Corporation (CIC)
DBP Leasing Corporation (DBP-LC)
LBP Insurance Brokerage, Inc. (LIBI)
LBP Leasing and Finance Corporation (LLFC)
National Development Company (NDC)
National Home Mortgage Finance Corporation (NHMFC)
Philippine Crop Insurance Corporation (PCIC)
Philippine Deposit Insurance Corporation (PDIC)
Small Business Corporation (SBCorp)
Social Housing Finance Corporation (SHFC)
Philippine Guarantee Corporation 
UCPB Leasing and Finance Corporation (ULFC)
UCPB Securities, Inc. (USI)

Social security institutions 
Employees Compensation Commission (ECC)
Government Service Insurance System (GSIS)
Home Development Mutual Fund (Pag-IBIG Fund)
Philippine Health Insurance Corporation (PhilHealth)
Social Security System (SSS)
Veterans Federation of the Philippines (VFP)

Trade, area development, and tourism sector

Trade 
Center for International Trade Expositions and Missions (CITEM)
Duty Free Philippines Corporation (DFPC)
Philippine International Trading Corporation (PITC)
Philippine Pharma Procurement, Inc. (PPPI)
National Food Authority (NFA)
Planters Products, Inc. (PPI)
Planters Foundation, Inc. (PFI)

Area development 
Bases Conversion and Development Authority (BCDA)
Clark Development Corporation (CDC)
John Hay Management Corporation (JHMC)
Laguna Lake Development Authority (LLDA)
National Housing Authority (NHA)
Palacio del Gobernador Condominium Corporation (PDGCC)
Philippine Reclamation Authority (PRA)
Poro Point Management Corporation (PPMC)
Quezon City Development Authority (QCDA)
Southern Philippines Development Authority (SPDA)
Tourism Infrastructure and Enterprise Zone Authority (TIEZA)

Tourism 
Corregidor Foundation, Inc. (CFI)
Marawi Resort Hotel, Inc. (MRHI)
Philippine Retirement Authority (PRA)
Tourism Promotions Board (TPB)

Educational and cultural sector

Educational 
Boy Scouts of the Philippines (BSP)
Girl Scouts of the Philippines (GSP)
Philippine Tax Academy (PTA)

Cultural 
Cultural Center of the Philippines (CCP)
Nayong Pilipino Foundation (NPF)

Gaming sector 
Philippine Amusement and Gaming Corporation (PAGCOR)
Philippine Charity Sweepstakes Office (PCSO)

Energy and materials sector

Energy 
National Electrification Administration (NEA)
National Power Corporation (NPC)
National Transmission Corporation (TRANSCO)
Philippine National Oil Company (PNOC)
Power Sector Assets and Liabilities Management Corporation (PSALM)
PNOC Exploration Corporation (PNOC-EC)
PNOC Renewables Corporation (PNOC-RC)
Philippine Electricity Market Corporation (PEMC)

Materials 
Batong Buhay Gold Mines, Inc. (BBGMI)
Bukidnon Forest, Inc. (BFI)
Natural Resources Development Corporation (NRDC)
Philippine Mining Development Corporation (PMDC)

Agriculture, fisheries, and food sector

Agriculture and fisheries 
National Dairy Authority (NDA)
National Tobacco Administration (NTA)
Philippine Coconut Authority (PCA)
Philippine Fisheries Development Authority (PFDA)
Sugar Regulatory Administration (SRA)

Food 
Cagayan de Oro Oil Company, Inc. (CAGOIL)
Food Terminal Inc. (FTI)
Granexport Manufacturing Corporation (Granex)
Iligan Coconut Industries, Inc. (ILICOCO)
Legaspi Oil Company, Inc. (LEGOIL)
National Sugar Development Company (NASUDECO)
San Pablo Manufacturing Corporation (SPMC)
Southern Luzon Coconut Oil Mill, Inc. (SOLCOM)

Utilities and communications sector

Utilities 
Cebu Port Authority (CPA)
Civil Aviation Authority of the Philippines (CAAP)
Clark International Airport Corporation (CIAC)
Davao International Airport Authority (DIAA)
Light Rail Transit Authority (LRTA)
Local Water Utilities Administration (LWUA)
Mactan–Cebu International Airport Authority (MCIAA)
Manila International Airport Authority (MIAA)
Metropolitan Waterworks and Sewerage System – Corporate Office (MWSS-CO)
Metropolitan Waterworks and Sewerage System – Regulatory Office (MWSS-RO)
National Irrigation Administration (NIA)
PEA Tollway Corporation (PEA-TC)
Philippine Aerospace Development Corporation (PADC)
Philippine National Construction Corporation (PNCC)
Philippine National Railways (PNR)
Philippine Ports Authority (PPA)

Communications 
APO Production Unit, Inc. (APO-PUI)
People's Television Network, Inc. (PTNI)
Philippine Postal Corporation (PHLPost)

Healthcare services sector 
La Union Medical Center (LUMC)

Realty and/or holding companies 
Anglo Ventures Corporation
AP Holdings, Inc.
ARC Investors, Inc.
ASC Investors, Inc.
Batangas Land Company, Inc. (BLCI)
Fernandez Holdings, Inc.
First Meridian Development, Inc.
G. Y. Real Estate, Inc. (GYREI)
Kamayan Realty Corporation (KRC)
Pinagkaisa Realty Corporation (PiRC)
Randy Allied Ventures, Inc.
Rock Steel Resources, Inc.
Roxas Shares, Inc.
San Miguel Officers Corp. Inc.
Soriano Shares, Inc.
Te Deum Resources, Inc.
Toda Holdings, Inc.
Valhalla Properties, Inc.

GOCCs supervised by the Presidential Commission on Good Government 

Banahaw Broadcasting Corporation (BBC)
Bataan Shipyard and Engineering Company (BASECO)
Chemfields, Inc. (CI)
Independent Realty Corporation (IRC)
Mid-Pasig Land Development Corporation (MLDC)
Performance Investment Corporation (PIC)
Piedras Petroleum Company, Inc. (PIEDRAS)
UCPB–CIIF Finance and Development Corporation (COCOFINANCE)
UCPB–CIIF Foundation, Inc.
United Coconut Chemicals, Inc. (COCOCHEM)
United Coconut Planters Bank General Insurance, Inc. (COCOGEN)
United Coconut Planters Life Assurance Corporation (COCOLIFE)

Under privatization 
GSIS Family Bank (GSIS-FB)
Intercontinental Broadcasting Corporation (IBC)
Monterrosa Development Corporation (MDC)

Non-operational, inactive, or deactivated 
Anchor Estate, Inc. (AEI)
Aviation Services and Training Institute (ASTI)
BCDA Management and Holdings, Inc. (BMHI)
Calauag Quezon Province Integrated Coconut Processing Plant, Inc. (CQPICPPI)
Clark Polytechnic Development Foundation (CPDF)
DBP Management Corporation (DBPMC)
First Centennial Clark Corporation (FCCC)
GSIS Mutual Fund, Inc. (GSIS-MFI)
GSIS Properties, Inc. (GSIS-PI)
Integrated Feed Mills Manufacturing Corporation (IFMC)
Inter-Island Gas Service, Inc. (IIGSI)
LBP Financial Services SpA  (Rome, Italy) (LBP-FSS)
LBP Remittance Company  (USA) (LBP-RC)
LBP Singapore Representative Office (LBP-SRO)
LBP Taiwan Representative Office (LBP-TRO)
LWUA Consult, Inc. (LWUA-CI)
Manila Gas Corporation (MGC)
Masaganang Sakahan, Inc. (MSI)
Meat Packing Corporation of the Philippines (MPCP)
Metro Transit Organization, Inc. (MTOI)
NDC–Philippine Infrastructure Corporation (NPIC)
North Davao Mining Corporation (NDMC)
North Luzon Railways Corporation (NORTHRAIL)
Paskuhan Development, Inc. (PDI)
Phil. Centennial Expo '98 Corp. (EXPO FILIPINO)
Philpost Leasing and Financing Corporation (PLFC)

Under abolition 
AFP Retirement and Separation Benefits System (AFP-RSBS)
Alabang–Sto. Tomas Development, Inc. (ASDI)
CDCP Farms Corporation (CDCP-FC)
Disc Contractors, Builders and General Services, Inc. (DISC)
First Cavite Industrial Estate, Inc. (FCIEI)
HGC Subic Corporation (HGC-SC)
Human Settlements Development Corporation (HSDC)
National Agri-Business Corporation (NABCOR)
NIA Consult, Inc. (NIACI)
Northern Foods Corporation (NFC)
Panay Railways Inc. (PRI)
Partido Development Administration (PDA)
Philippine Agricultural Development and Commercial Corporation (PADCC)
Philippine Forest Corporation (PFC)
Philippine Fruits and Vegetables Industries, Inc. (PFVII)
Philippine Sugar Corporation (PHILSUCOR)
Philippine Veterans Assistance Commission (PVAC)
Philippine Veterans Investment Development Corporation (PHIVIDEC)
PNOC Alternative Fuel Corp. (PNOC-AFC)
PNOC Development and Management Corporation (PNOC-DMC)
PNOC Shipping and Transport Corporation (PNOC-STC)
Quedan and Rural Credit Guarantee Corporation (QUEDANCOR)
San Carlos Fruits Corporation (SCFC)
Technology Resources Center (TRC)
Tierra Factors Corporation (TFC)
Traffic Control Products Corporation (TCPC)
Zamboanga National Agricultural College – Rubber Estate Corp. (ZREC)

Dissolved or abolished 
Bataan Technology Park, Inc. (BTPI)
Cottage Industry Technology Center (CITC)
National Livelihood Development Corp. (NLDC)
People's Credit and Finance Corporation (PCFC)

Privatized 
Southern Utility Management and Services, Inc. (SUMSI)

Merged GOCCs 
Home Guaranty Corporation (HGC)
United Coconut Planters Bank (UCPB)

GOCCs disposed by the Privatization and Management Office 
Menzi Development Corporation (MDC)

GOCCs excluded from the coverage of Republic Act No. 10149 
Bangko Sentral ng Pilipinas (BSP)
Central Bank – Board of Liquidators (CB-COL)
Development Academy of the Philippines (DAP)
Philippine International Convention Center (PICC)
PHIVIDEC Panay Agro-Industrial Corp. (PPAlC)

Research institutions 
Lung Center of the Philippines (LCP)
National Kidney and Transplant Institute (NKTI)
Philippine Center for Economic Development (PCED)
Philippine Children's Medical Center (PCMC)
Philippine Heart Center (PHC)
Philippine Institute for Development Studies (PIDS)
Philippine Institute of Traditional and Alternative Health Care (PITAHC)
Philippine Rice Research Institute (PRRI)

Economic zone authorities 
Aurora Pacific Economic Zone and Freeport Authority (APECO)
Authority of the Freeport Area of Bataan (AFAB)
Cagayan Economic Zone Authority (CEZA)
Freeport Services Corporation (FSC)
Northeastern Luzon Pacific Coastal Services, Inc. (NLPCS)
Philippine Economic Zone Authority (PEZA)
Phividec Industrial Authority (PIA)
Subic Bay Metropolitan Authority (SBMA)
Zamboanga City Special Economic Zone Authority (ZCSEZA)

Created by a Supreme Court decision 
Radio Philippines Network (RPN)

Sui generis 
Millennium Challenge Account Philippines (MCAP)

See also 

 List of government-owned companies

Notes

References

External links 
 Official website of the Governance Commission of GOCCs
 List of GOCCs from the Official Gazette of the Philippines
 List of GOCCs from the Department of Budget and Management
 Directory of 67 GOCCs' websites from the Department of Science and Technology

 
Politics of the Philippines
Political organizations based in the Philippines
Philippines politics-related lists
Business in the Philippines
Philippines